The 1997 Hamilton Tiger-Cats season was the 40th season for the team in the Canadian Football League and their 48th overall. The Tiger-Cats finished in 4th place in the East Division with a 2–16 record and failed to make the playoffs.

Offseason

CFL Draft

Ottawa Rough Riders Dispersal Draft

Preseason

Regular season

Season standings

Schedule

Awards and honours

1997 CFL All-Stars

References

Hamilton Tiger-Cats seasons
Hamilton